Karl Gustav Abramsson (born 11 November 1947 in Stensele) is a Swedish social democratic politician who has been a member of the Riksdag from 1998 to 2010.

See also 

 List of members of the Riksdag, 1998–2002
 List of members of the Riksdag, 2002–2006
 List of members of the Riksdag, 2006–2010

References

1947 births
Living people
People from Storuman Municipality
Members of the Riksdag from the Social Democrats
Members of the Riksdag 1998–2002
Members of the Riksdag 2002–2006
Members of the Riksdag 2006–2010
20th-century Swedish politicians
21st-century Swedish politicians